Solesmes (Picard: Solinmes) is a commune in the Nord department in northern France.

Heraldry

Education 
The city is home to:

 the École Saint-Joseph.
 the 'Institution Saint Michel: Collège and Lycée', a Catholic Secondary School with boarding facilities.
 the Collège  Saint Exupéry.

See also
Communes of the Nord department

References

External links
 Aujourd'hui à Solesmes (in French)

Communes of Nord (French department)